This is a list of films made by Hammer Film Productions.

The list does not include the 13 hour-long ITC Entertainment television episodes, Hammer House of Horror, broadcast in 1980.

Feature films 
These are the known, theatrically released, feature-length films produced or co-produced by Hammer Productions. Shorter works and television productions are listed separately. When two titles are shown for a single film, the first title is that as released in the U.K., the second in the U.S. During its most productive period of activity (1947−1979), Hammer released 158 films, 50 of which can be regarded as falling within the horror genre.

1935–1979

2008–present

Selected shorter works

 Polly's Two Fathers (1935) featurette
 Musical Merrytones No.1 (1936) short
 Candy's Calendar (1946) featurette
 Cornish Holiday (1946) featurette
 An Englishman's Home (1946) short
 It's a Dog's Life (1946) short
 Peke's Sold a Pop (1946) short
 Perchance to Sail (1946) short
 Skiffy Goes to Sea (1946) short
 Tiny Wings (1946) short
 We Do Believe in Ghosts (1946) featurette
 Birthplace of Fame (1947) short
 Bred to Stay (1947) featurette
 Crime Reporter (1947) featurette
 Life Is Nothing Without Music (1947) short
 Material Evidence (1947) featurette
 Paddy's Milestone (1947) short
 What the Stars Foretell (1947) short
 Emerald Isle (1948) short
 The End of the Bridge (1948) short
 Highland Story (1948) short
 Tale of a City (1948) featurette
 Monkey Manners (1950) short
 Queer Fish (1950) short
 The Village of Bray (1951) short
 Giselle (1951) short
 Call of the Land (1952) short
 Mad for Laughs (1952) short
 River Ships (1952) short
 Between Two Frontiers (1953) short
 Cathedral City (1953) short
 A Day in the Country (1953) short
 Sky Traders (1953) short
 Valley of Peace (1953) short
 The World's Smallest Country (1953) short
 Dennis Compton (1954) short
 Holiday on Skis (1954) short
 The Mirror and Markheim (1954) featurette
 Polo (1954) short
 The Adventures of Dick Barton (1955) 15-part serial edited together from the three previously released 'Dick Barton' feature films
 Part 2 (The Poison Dart)
 Part 3 (The Smugglers' Cove)
 Part 4 (Trapped)
 Part 5 (Plan For Revenge)
 Part 6 (Fight To The Finish)
 Part 7 (Sudden Death)
 Part 8 (Yellow Peril)
 Part 9 (The Fiendish Experiment)
 Part 10 (Fight For Life)
 Part 11 (The World At Stake)
 Part 12 (The Wail Of Fear)
 Part 13 (Foiled Again!)
 Part 14 (Trapped In The Snake House)
 Part 15 (The Tower Of Terror)
 Archery (1955)
 A Body Like Mine (1955)
 Cyril Stapleton & His Showband (1955) featurette
 Dick Turpin - Highwayman (1955) featurette
 The Eric Winstone Band Show (1955) short
 Eric Winstone's Stagecoach (1955) short
 A Man on the Beach (1955) featurette
 The Noble Art (1955) short
 Parade of the Bands (1955) short
 The Right Person (1955) featurette
 Setting the Pace (1955) short
 Barbara's Boyfriend (1956) short
 Belles on Her Toes (1956) short
 Chaos in the Rockery (1956) short
 Copenhagen (1956) short
 Dinner for Mr. Hemmingway (1956) short
 History Repeats Itself (1956) short
 An Idea for Ben (1956) short
 Just for You (1956) short
 The Magic Carpet (1956) short
 Moving In (1956) short
 Parade of the Bands (1956) short
 Pleasure Hunt (1956) short
 The Round Up (1956) short
 Danger List (1957) featurette
 Dangerous Drugs (1957) short
 Day of Grace (1957) featurette
 The Edmundo Ros Half-Hour (1957) featurette
 Italian Holiday (1957) short
 Keeping Fit with Yoga (1957) short
 Man With a Dog (1957) short
 Seven Wonders of the World (1957) short
 Sunshine Holiday (1957) short
 Yoga and the Average Man (1957) short
 Yoga and You (1957) short
 Blue Highwayman (1958) short
 Cathay Pacific (1958) short
 Clean Sweep (1958) featurette
 The Enchanted Island (1958) short
 Murder at Site 3 (1958) short
 The Riviera Express (1958) short
 The Seven Wonders of Ireland (1958) short
 Danger List (1959) short
 Operation Universe (1959) short
 Ticket to Happiness (1959) short
 Ticket to Paradise (1959) short
 Sands of the Desert (1960) short
 Highway Holiday (1961) short
 Land of the Leprechauns (1961) short
 O'Hara's Holiday (1961) short
 Modern Ireland (1961) short
 National Sporting Club (1961) short
 Sportsman's Pledge (1962) short
 Do Me a Favour, Kill Me * (1968)
 Eve * (1968)
 Jane Brown's Body * (1968)
 Matakitas is Coming * (1968)
 Miss Belle * (1968)
 One on an Island * (1968)
 Paper Dolls * (1968)
 Somewhere in a Crowd * (1968)
 The Beckoning Fair One * (1968)
 The Girl of My Dreams * (1968)
 The Indian Spirit Guide * (1968)
 The New People * (1968)
 A Stranger in the Family * (1969)
 Poor Butterfly * (1969)
 The Killing Bottle * (1969)
 The Last Visitor * (1969)
 The Madison Equation * (1969)
an episode of the TV series Journey to the Unknown

Notes

References

Filmographies
Hammer Film Productions
Lists of British films